Otto Rüfenacht (27 October 1919 – 1 November 1982) was a Swiss fencer. He won a bronze medal in the team épée event at the 1952 Summer Olympics.

References

1919 births
1982 deaths
Swiss male fencers
Olympic fencers of Switzerland
Fencers at the 1948 Summer Olympics
Fencers at the 1952 Summer Olympics
Olympic bronze medalists for Switzerland
Olympic medalists in fencing
Medalists at the 1952 Summer Olympics